Savanah Leaf (born 24 November 1993) is a film director and photographer. Her directorial work includes music videos for Gary Clark, Jr.'s single This Land (Grammy Award for Best Music Video nominee) and "What About Us") and Common ("HER Love.")

Leaf is a former British volleyball player and competed for Great Britain at the 2012 Summer Olympics.

References

British music video directors
British women film directors
British women's volleyball players
Volleyball players at the 2012 Summer Olympics
Olympic volleyball players of Great Britain
1993 births
Living people
Miami Hurricanes athletes